Eduardo Enrique Vilches Arriagada (born 21 April 1963) is a former Chilean footballer who played as a defender.

Club career
Vilches began his professional career with Magallanes, before moving to Universidad Católica and Colo-Colo, with a brief step on loan at Malleco Unido. He also played for Necaxa in the Primera División de Mexico. In 1999 he returned to Chile and joined Unión Española, winning the 1999 Primera B.

International career
Vilches made 30 appearances for the senior Chile national football team from 1990 to 1998. He made his debut on October 17, 1990 in a friendly match against Brazil (0-0).

Coaching career
In 2014, he coached Malleco Unido in the Segunda División Profesional de Chile.

Honours

Club
Universidad Católica
Chilean Primera División (1): 1987

Colo-Colo
Chilean Primera División (4): 1989, 1990, 1991, 1993
Copa Chile (3): 1989, 1990, 1994
Copa Libertadores (1): 1991
Copa Interamericana (1): 1991
Recopa Sudamericana (1): 1992

Necaxa
Primera División (3): 1994–95, 1995–96, Invierno 1998
Copa México (1): 1994–95
Campeón de Campeones (1): 
CONCACAF Cup Winners Cup (1): 1994
CONCACAF Champions' Cup (1): 1999

Unión Española
Primera B de Chile (1): 1999

International
Chile
 Copa Expedito Teixeira (1): 1990

Individual
Primera División de México Best Defender: 1994–95

References

External links
 
 

1963 births
Living people
Footballers from Santiago
Chilean footballers
Chilean expatriate footballers
Chile international footballers
Deportes Magallanes footballers
Malleco Unido footballers
Club Deportivo Universidad Católica footballers
Colo-Colo footballers
Club Necaxa footballers
Unión Española footballers
Cobreloa footballers
Magallanes footballers
Primera B de Chile players
Chilean Primera División players
Liga MX players
Chilean expatriate sportspeople in Mexico
Expatriate footballers in Mexico
1991 Copa América players
1993 Copa América players
1995 Copa América players
Association football defenders
People from Santiago Metropolitan Region
Chilean football managers
Segunda División Profesional de Chile managers